was a Japanese educator who founded Tsuda University. She was the daughter of Tsuda Sen, an agricultural scientist, and at the age of 7, she became Japan's first female exchange student, traveling to the U.S. on the same ship as the Iwakura Mission.

Originally named Tsuda Ume, with ume referring to the Japanese plum, she went by the name Ume Tsuda while studying in the United States before changing her name to Umeko in 1902.

Early life 

Tsuda Ume was born in the Ushigome neighborhood of Edo (present Minami, Shinjuku) as the second daughter of Tsuda Sen and his wife Hatsuko, a progressive agriculturist and strong proponent of the westernization and Christianization of Japan. In 1871, Tsuda Sen was involved in the Hokkaido colonization project under Kuroda Kiyotaka, and raised the topic of western education for women as well as for men.

Under Kuroda's sponsorship, Tsuda Ume was volunteered by her father as one of five women members of the Iwakura mission.

At the age of six, she was also the youngest member of the expedition. She arrived in San Francisco in November 1871 and remained in the United States as a student until she was 18 years old.

Tsuda lived in Washington, D.C. from December 1871 with Charles Lanman (the secretary of Japanese legation), and his wife Adeline. As they had no children, they welcomed her like their own child. Under the name of Ume Tsuda, she attended the middle-class Georgetown Collegiate School, where she learned English. Upon graduating, she received awards in composition, writing, arithmetic, and deportment. After graduating, she entered the Archer Institute, which catered to the daughters of politicians and bureaucrats. She excelled in language, math, science, and music, especially the piano. In addition to English, she also studied Latin and French. About one year after arriving in the United States, Tsuda asked to be baptized as a Christian. Although the Lanmans were Episcopalians, they decided she should attend the nonsectarian Old Swedes Church.

Coming back to Japan 
By the time Tsuda returned to Japan in 1882, she had almost forgotten Japanese, her native language, which caused temporary difficulties. She also experienced cultural problems adjusting to the inferior position of women in Japanese society. Even her father, Tsuda Sen, who was radically westernized in many ways, was still traditionally patriarchal and authoritarian with regards to women.

Tsuda was hired by Itō Hirobumi to be a tutor for his children. In 1885, she then began to work in a girls' school for the daughters of the kazoku peerage, known as Peeresses' School, but she was not satisfied by the restriction of educational opportunities to within the peerage and nobility, and she was not satisfied with the school policy that education was intended to polish girls as ladies and train them to be obedient wives and good mothers. She was assisted from 1888 by a friend from her days in America, Alice Bacon, from 1888. She decided to return to the United States.

Second stay in the United States 

Tsuda returned to the United States and attended Bryn Mawr College in Philadelphia from 1889 to 1892, where she majored in biology and education. She also studied at St Hilda's College, Oxford. During her second stay in the United States, Tsuda decided that other Japanese women should have the opportunity to study overseas as well. She made numerous public speeches about Japanese women's education and raised $8,000 in funds to establish a scholarship for Japanese women.

Establishment of Tsuda College 

After returning to Japan, Tsuda Ume once again taught at Peeresses' School, as well as at Tokyo Women's Normal School, her salary was 800 yen and her post was the highest available to women of her era. She published several dissertations and made speeches about improving the status of women. The 1899 Girl's Higher Education Law, required each prefecture to establish at least one public middle school for girls. However, these schools were not able to provide girls with the same quality of education as that of the boys' schools. In 1900, with the help of her friends Princess Ōyama Sutematsu and Alice Bacon, she founded the  located in Kōjimachi, Tokyo to provide equal opportunity for a liberal arts education for all women regardless of parentage. She later changed her name to Tsuda Umeko in 1902. The school faced a chronic funding shortfall, and Tsuda spent much time fundraising in order to support the school. Due to her enthusiastic efforts, the school gained official recognition in 1903.

In 1905, Tsuda became the first president of the Japanese branch of the Tokyo YWCA.

Death 
Tsuda's busy life eventually undermined her health, and she suffered a stroke. In January 1919, she retired to her summer cottage in Kamakura, where she died after a long illness in 1929 at age 64. Her grave is on the grounds of Tsuda College in Kodaira, Tokyo.

Legacy 
Joshi Eigaku Juku changed its name to Tsuda Eigaku Juku in 1933 and became Tsuda Daigaku in Japanese and Tsuda College in English after World War II. In 2017, the English name was changed to Tsuda University. It remains one of the most prestigious women's institutes of higher education in Japan.
Although Tsuda strongly desired social reform for women, she did not advocate a feminist social movement, and she opposed the women's suffrage movement. Her activities were based on her philosophy that education should focus on developing individual intelligence and personality.

Tsuda Umeko will be featured on new Japanese banknotes to be issued in 2024.

See also 
 Tsuda University
 Ōyama Sutematsu
 Daughters of the Samurai: A Journey from East to West and Back

References

Sources 
 Jansen, Marius B. The Making of Modern Japan. Cambridge: Harvard University Press, 2000. ;  OCLC 44090600
 
 Nussbaum, Louis-Frédéric and Käthe Roth. (2005).  Japan encyclopedia. Cambridge: Harvard University Press. ;  OCLC 58053128
 Rose, Barbara. Tsuda Umeko and Women's Education in Japan. New Haven, CT: Yale University Press, 1992.

External links 

 Tsuda University

19th-century Japanese educators
Alumni of St Hilda's College, Oxford
Bryn Mawr College alumni
1864 births
1929 deaths
People from Tokyo
Japanese Protestants
Academic staff of Ochanomizu University
People of Meiji-period Japan
Members of the Iwakura Mission
Tsuda University
University and college founders
Women founders
Japanese women educators
19th-century Japanese women